Chilly is an unincorporated community in Custer County, Idaho.

History
A post office called Chilly was established in 1902, and remained in operation until 1958. The community was so named on account of the often chilly air at the elevated town site.

Chilly's population was 107 in 1909.

References

Unincorporated communities in Custer County, Idaho
Unincorporated communities in Idaho